Mona Ullmann (born 14 May 1967) is a Norwegian paralympic athlete. She competed in athletics, including javelin throw, shot put, discus throw, long jump and combined events. 

She represented Tønsberg Athletics Club nationally and Norway internationally. She is the leader of the Vestfold county team of the Norwegian Association of the Blind  and is involved in matters for the blind and partially sighted. In 1991, she was appointed Tønsberg Knight  by Vestfold Market Forum.

Career 
Ullmann competed at the 1984 Paralympic Summer Games, winning a gold medal in Women's Pentathlon B3, silver medal in Women's Javelin B3, and bronze medal in Women's Long Jump B3, and Women's Shot Put B3.

At the 1988 Paralympic Summer Games, she won a gold medal in Women's Javelin B2, silver medal in Women's Shot Put B2, silver medal in Women's Pentathlon B2, and bronze medal in Women's Long Jump B2.

At the 1992 Paralympic Summer Games, she won bronze medals in Women's Discus Throw B2, Women's Shot Put B2, and Women's Javelin B1>3.

References 

1967 births
Living people
Sportspeople from Tønsberg
Paralympic athletes of Norway
Norwegian female discus throwers
Norwegian female javelin throwers
Norwegian female shot putters
Norwegian female long jumpers
Athletes (track and field) at the 1984 Summer Paralympics
Athletes (track and field) at the 1988 Summer Paralympics
Athletes (track and field) at the 1992 Summer Paralympics
Medalists at the 1984 Summer Paralympics
Medalists at the 1988 Summer Paralympics
Medalists at the 1992 Summer Paralympics
Paralympic discus throwers
Paralympic javelin throwers
Paralympic shot putters
Paralympic long jumpers
Visually impaired discus throwers
Visually impaired javelin throwers
Visually impaired shot putters
Visually impaired long jumpers
Paralympic gold medalists for Norway
Paralympic silver medalists for Norway
Paralympic bronze medalists for Norway